Shoals Township is one of 15 townships in Surry County, North Carolina, United States. The township had a population of 1,872 according to the 2000 census.

Geographically, Shoals Township occupies  in southern Surry County, with its southern border running along the Yadkin River.  There are no incorporated municipalities within Shoals Township; however, there are several smaller, unincorporated communities located here, including the community of Shoals.

Townships in Surry County, North Carolina
Townships in North Carolina